Rhodium(III) hydroxide is a chemical  compound with the formula Rh(OH)3.

Various compounds of rhodium(III) with hydroxide ligands are known.

Some double hydroxides called rhodium(III) hydrogarnets are known to exist. They include BaNaRh(OH)6, Ca3Rh2(OH)12, Sr3Rh2(OH)12. and Ba3[Rh(OH)6]2 ⋅ H2O.

Ga[Rh(OH)6(Mo6O18)](H2O)16 is a complex molybdate hydroxide.

References

Rhodium(III) compounds
Hydroxides